George Bliss may refer to:
George Bliss (pedicab designer), American bicycle designer
George William Bliss (1918–1978), American Pulitzer Prize-winning journalist
George Bliss (Congressman) (1813–1868), U.S. Representative from Ohio
George Bliss (Massachusetts), Massachusetts representative to the 1814 Hartford Convention
George Bliss (Massachusetts politician) (1793–1873), American businessman and politician
George N. Bliss (1837–1928), American soldier in the American Civil War
George R. Bliss (1883–1974), American politician
George Ripley Bliss (1816–1893), president of Bucknell University from 1857 to 1858 and 1871–72
George Y. Bliss (1864–1924), bishop of the Episcopal Diocese of Vermont